is a Japanese anime by DongWoo A&E. It is the second animation adaption of the PriPara  arcade game, as well as the sequel series to the PriPara  TV series. It began airing from April 4, 2017 to March 27, 2018. It was followed by Kiratto Pri☆Chan on April 8, 2018. An upcoming mobile game, Idol Land PriPara is set to be released in fall 2022.

Plot
Yui Yumekawa is a sixth grader in Avocado Academy, who daydreams a lot and wishes to become an idol, despite her school forbidding PriPara for students. After receiving her PriTicket, she finds out a new PriPara is opening, and Laala Manaka, the Divine Idol from the previous series, is in town, who also is her roommate in Avocado Academy, having been sent there to continue her Divine Idol duties.

However, Yui does not believe it, as a fold in Laala's PriTicket causes a system bug, leaving Laala unable to carry out PriPara change, and it is only after seeing Laala's idol form in the former's first performance in Paparajuku that Yui is finally convinced.

The upcoming Idol Time Grand Prix is also announced, however, with a lack of visitors, both the competition and the Paparajuku PriPara would be shut down, and so would Laala's job as a Divine Idol. And so, it is up to Laala and Yui to keep a flow of visitors to Paparajuku PriPara, as a number of characters from the original series turn up to help.

Characters

Playable Characters

MY☆DREAM 

Yui is a sixth grader in Class A at Avocado Academy. She has a habit of dreaming a lot and carries around Cooky, a rice cooker, as she spaces out in-between meals. She has short blonde hair in partly pigtails with a light blue hair bow, while in PriPara, she is taller, her hair is longer, she gains a pink hair bow, her pigtails are straighter, and her eyes gain a star marking. A Lovely-type idol, her theme color is pastel pink and uses her self-created brand, Fantasy Time.

Nino is a sixth grader in Class C at Avocado Academy. She is a girl full of passion and is skilled at sports. She has a tomboyish figure outside of PriPara, having short blue-green hair and green eyes. In PriPara, she becomes taller and her hair grows longer, also gaining a green ombré. A Pop-type idol, her theme color is neon green and her brand is Neon Drop. 

Michiru is a second-year student at Avocado Academy. She is usually a shy and quiet girl who is rather clumsy. She has gray hair styled into lower twintails, red-violet eyes, wears glasses and has freckles. In PriPara, her hair is set loose with some of it tied into braids. Her eyes gained black pupils as well. Her personality in PriPara changes into a more arrogant and confident person who refers to herself as someone possessed by the ghost princess "Miichiru" (ミーチル). A Cool-type idol, her theme color is dark purple and her brand is Melty Lily, which Aroma made for her. She became Aroma's "little devil" in episode 14.

Other Idols 

Debuted in episode 24, she is the younger sister of divine idol Mia Hanazono, who is the member of an idol trio Saints. Shuuka is obsessed with making money, often she have out of a feeling of rivalry with Yui. She's a Celeb-type idol and her brand is Rich Venus.

 Falala is an older sister of Jewlie and a time spirit of ancient PriPara who was in charge during the day. She feel asleep when Pakku and Gaarara began stealing girls' dreams causing them to forget about PriPara. She can be awakened again if the idols of the new PriPara help girls find their dreams. She's a Premium-type idol and her brand is Clock Garden.

 Garara is Falala's twin sister and a time spirit of ancient PriPara who was in charge during the night. As no one came to PriPara during the night, Garara was alone and grew out of jealousy to Falala. She discovers she can stay awake in the day if Pakku steals girls' dreams causing Falala to sleep forever.

Shuuka's older sister who is the one of the legendary Divine idol and the member of an idol trio Saints. She's the parallel version of the character, Mia Ageha from Pretty Rhythm Dear My Future.

WITH 
Male idol trio are exclusively playable in the "DanPri" mode. They also make non-playble "escort" characters in the Super Idol Time.

Yui's brother, a second-year student at Avocado Academy. The center of WITH who frequently teases Yui a lot.  

Shōgo's teammate. 

Shōgo's teammate.

Mascots 

Yui's manager. She takes the form of a unicorn. 

Nino's manager. She takes the form of a mouse. 

Michiru's manager. She takes the form of a sheep.

Galala's manager. She takes the form of a tapir.

Shuuka's manager. She takes the form of a dog.

Avocado Academy 

The headmistress of Avocado Academy who is the cousin of Paprika Academy headmistress Gloria Ookanda. She despised the idea of female idols until she saw Yui performing with a twisted ankle. In episode 23, Bavaria became a PriPara idol with Mimiko Jigoku whom she took care of as mother since Mimiko enrolled in Avocado Academy. She is a fan of WITH. 

Avocado Academy's head disciplinarian. When she was young, Mimiko's dream was to become an idol. When she enrolled into Avocado Academy as a preschooler, she was taken care of by the headmistress whom she saw as a mother-like figure. After being told she couldn't be an idol in preschool because of her family name meaning "hell", Mimiko would despise the idea of PriPara until episode 16 when she remembered her dream and decided to go on a journey. In episode 23, Mimiko returns to Paparajuku and becomes a PriPara idol with Bavaria.

Media

Anime

Crunchyroll licensed the series.

Music
Openings:
"Just be yourself" by The World Standard
 by The World Standard
"Memorial" by I☆Ris
Endings: 
"Idol:Time!!" by Laala Manaka (Himika Akenaya) and Yui Yumekawa (Arisa Date). 
 by Yui Yumekawa (Arisa Date), Nino Nijiiro (Yō Taichi) and Michiru Kouda (Yuina Yamada)
"WELCOME TO DREAM" by The World Standard.
Insert Songs:
 by Yui Yumekawa (Arisa Date)
 by WITH [Shougo Yumekawa (Seiichirō Yamashita), Koyoi Takase (Reiou Tsuchida), and Asahi Mitaka (Tatsuyuki Kobayashi). It is the first song to be sung entirely by male performers.
 by Laala Manaka (Himika Akenaya) and Yui Yumekawa (Arisa Date)
 by Nino Nijiiro (Yō Taichi)
 by Michiru Kouda (Yuina Yamada)
 by Sion Tōdō (Saki Yamakita) and Nino Nijiiro (Yō Taichi)
 by Shuuka Hanazono (Madoka Asahina)
 by Falala•A•Larm (Azusa Satō).
"Believe My DREAM!" by MY☆DREAM [Yui Yumekawa (Arisa Date), Nino Nijiiro (Yō Taichi) and Michiru Kouda (Yuina Yamada)
 by Garara•S•Leep(Tomoyo Kurosawa).
 by Mia Hanazono (Rumi Ōkubo). It is a cover of Pretty Rhythm: Dear My Future's first opening.
 by Falala•A•Larm (Azusa Satou) and Garara•S•Leep(Tomoyo Kurosawa).
"Get Over Dress-code" by Dressing Pafé [Sion Tōdō (Saki Yamakita), Dorothy West (Azuki Shibuya), and Leona West (Yuki Wakai)]

References

External links
Takara Tomy site 
TV Tokyo site 
 

2017 anime television series debuts
Anime films based on video games
Anime television series based on video games
Crunchyroll anime
Music in anime and manga
Tatsunoko Production
TV Tokyo original programming
Takara Tomy
Japanese idols in anime and manga
Pripara